Pallatanga Canton is a canton of Ecuador, located in the Chimborazo Province.  Its capital is the town of Pallatanga.  Its population at the 2001 census was 10,800.

References

Cantons of Chimborazo Province